The Liaquat National Hospital is located at Stadium Road, Karachi, Sindh, Pakistan.

History
Soon after Independence the Red Cross Fete Committee, which was chaired by Syed Wajid Ali, raised about PKR 800,000 through meena bazaars organized under the guidance of Rana Liaquat Ali Khan. At a meeting chaired by Khan, the committee decided to establish a national hospital in Karachi, Pakistan. Malik Ghulam Muhammad, the governor-general of Pakistan, laid the foundation stone of the hospital on 23 February 1953. After completion, president of Pakistan, Iskander Mirza, inaugurated it on 16 October 1958.

In memory of Nawabzada Liaquat Ali Khan, the first Prime Minister of Pakistan who were assassinated in 1951, the national hospital was renamed later as Liaquat National Hospital.

Syed Wajid Ali was selected as the president of a committee of citizens, philanthropists, technocrats and government functionaries on November 5, 1958, and remained so till his death in 2008.

In 1978, the institute entered into the field of education. Today, it plays a role as a leading postgraduate medical centre having school of nursing, a school of physiotherapy and rehabilitation, College of Medical Laboratory Technology, and offers technical courses in a spectrum of services.

Now, the hospital has 700 beds with 32 specialty services, providing diagnostic and therapeutic facilities. The hospital has a residency training program, representing a majority of the existing disciplines.

Recognition
Recognised for fellowship by the College of Physicians and Surgeons Pakistan, including disciplines which are also recognised by the Royal Colleges in the UK.

Departments

The hospital has MRI machines, pathology laboratory facilities, additional Executive II and III Wards, CCU, MICU, dialysis machines and ventilators. An operation theatre, intensive care unit. and transplant unit complex are under construction.

Clinical departments

 Medical and allied
 Cardiology
 Chest medicine
 Dermatology
 Diabetes, endocrinology, and metabolism
 Gastroenterology
 General medicine
 Nephrology
 Neurology
 Oncology
 Paediatric medicine
 Psychiatry
 Rheumatology
 Surgical and allied
 Accident and emergency (trauma patients treatment)
 Anesthesia and clinical care
 Breast diseases
 Cardiothoracic surgery
 Dentistry and maxillofacial surgery
 E.N.T head and neck surgery
 Gynaecology and obstetrics
 General surgery
 Ophthalmology
 Orthopedic surgery
 Plastic and reconstructive surgery
 Pediatrics surgery
 Spinal and neurosurgery
 Urology
 Vascular surgery
 Diagnostics
 Biochemistry
 Haematology and blood bank
 Histopathology
 Laboratory collection center
 Microbiology
 Molecular pathology
 Radiology
 Other clinical departments
 Pharmacy
 Physical therapy and rehab

Basic sciences

 Anatomy
 Biochemistry
 Community medicine
 Forensic medicine
 Physiology
 Pathology and microbiology
 Pharmacology and therapeutics

Other services

 Academic council
 Health information management services
 Nutrition and food services
 Medical education
 Social services department

Facilities

 Day care centre
 Home health services
 Library
 Rehabilitation
 Research and skills development centre
 Fitness center
 Sports ground

References

External links
Liaquat National Hospital

Hospital buildings completed in 1958
Hospitals in Karachi
Hospitals established in 1958
1958 establishments in Pakistan